An HCNG dispenser is a type of fuel dispenser at a filling station that is used to pump HCNG into vehicles.

Principle
An HCNG dispenser is in general combined with a CNG dispenser for natural gas vehicles as both use the same feed stream from the compressed natural gas grid, in addition the hydrogen production method differs per station, some stations use on-site generation where other stations use on-site delivery of hydrogen to feed the HCNG dispensers. The dispensed blend is  30% H2 by volume with CNG at 250 bar non-communication fill as HCNG

Locations
HCNG dispensers can be found at Hynor (Norway) Thousand palms and Barstow  California Fort Collins Colorado,  Dunkerque, Grenoble and  Toulouse (France) Göteborg Sweden,  Dwarka and Faridabad (Delhi),  India   and the BC hydrogen highway in Canada.

See also
Hydrogen compressor
Hydrogen infrastructure
Hydrogen station
Hydrogen economy

References

Pumps
Natural gas infrastructure
Filling stations